Mostafa Jamal Haider  is a Bangladeshi politician affiliated with the Jatiya Party who served the Pirojpur-1 district as a member of the Jatiya Sangsad from 1986 to 1991. He is the current chairman of the Jatiya Party (Zafar).

Birth and early life 
Mostafa Jamal Haider was born on 10 December 1942 in Pirojpur district.

Career 
Mostafa Jamal Haider was elected to parliament from Pirojpur-1 as a Jatiya Party candidate in 1986 and 1988.

References

External links 

List of 3rd Parliament Members -Jatiya Sangsad (In Bangla)
List of 4th Parliament Members -Jatiya Sangsad (In Bangla)

Living people
1942 births
People from Pirojpur District
Jatiya Party politicians
3rd Jatiya Sangsad members
4th Jatiya Sangsad members